Frederick L. Ketchum (July 27, 1875 – March 12, 1908) was an American Major League Baseball outfielder. He played for the Louisville Colonels during the  season and the Philadelphia Athletics during the  season.

References

Major League Baseball outfielders
Philadelphia Athletics players
Louisville Colonels players
Baseball players from New York (state)
Cortland Red Dragons baseball players
1875 births
1908 deaths
19th-century baseball players
Cortland Hirelings players
Cortland Wagonmakers players
Milwaukee Brewers (minor league) players
Wilkes-Barre Coal Barons players
Kansas City Blues (baseball) players
Kansas City Blue Stockings players
Denver Grizzlies (baseball) players
Joplin Miners players
Leavenworth Orioles players
St. Joseph Saints players
Webb City Goldbugs players
Pueblo Indians players
Lincoln Treeplanters players